Ballista Futbol Club is an association football team that plays in Luquillo.  They currently play in the Puerto Rico Soccer League.

History 
On December 4, 2015; Ballista FC was already moving to meet all the requirements to be admitted as a club and league franchisee of the Puerto Rico Soccer League. They planned to establish an academy, tentatively in the municipality of Rio Grande, where children of poor resources of the municipality can participate for free. Former Levittown Athletic Club staff have become members of the Ballista FC Board of Directors with signings of Sigfredo Gumá as General Manager, Arnaldo Escobar as president, Julio Steuart as vice president, and Elliot Rivera as Treasurer.

After months of searching and negotiations with the municipalities of Canóvanas, Rio Grande and Luquillo, the club vice president Julio Stuart, reached an agreement and found a home on the Riviera Pitihaya River in the municipality of Luquillo, Puerto Rico with El Complejo Deportivo José Salamán Estrella as it home field.

Colors and badge

Kit manufacturers
 2016–Present: Luanvi

Shirt sponsors
 2016: None
 2017:

Current squad
April 10, 2016

2017

Matches

Friendlies
March 5 2017 4:00 Pm :  Vs. Caguas Sporting FC
Location:  Pista José Salaman Estrella
Result:

Transfers

In

Club hierarchy

Team management 

{| class="wikitable"
|-
! style="background:#6CADDF; color:#091F3F;" scope="col" colspan="2" |Executive
|-

|-

|-

|-

|-
 
|-

|-
! style="background:#6CADDF; color:#091F3F;" scope="col" colspan="2" |Coaching staff

|-

|-

|-

|-

|-

|-

Year-by-year

Achievements

References

External links

Liga Nacional de Fútbol de Puerto Rico teams
Sports in Mayagüez, Puerto Rico
Football clubs in Puerto Rico
Puerto Rico Soccer League teams
2004 establishments in Puerto Rico